The Hot Springs Bathhouse and Commercial Historic District in Truth or Consequences in Truth or Consequences, New Mexico is a  historic district which was listed on the National Register of Historic Places in 2005.

It is roughly bounded by Post, Van Patten, Pershing and Main Streets.  The district encompasses "much of the city's historic downtown and nearby mineral baths and apartments that served visitors who came to the health resort community between 1916 and 1950 when it was known as Hot Springs. The district also encompasses the locations of the approximately 35 artesian wells, springs and sumps identified in a 1940 geological study of the thermal waters of the Hot Springs Artesian Basin. Included within the district are 125 contributing properties and 87 noncontributing properties."

See also
Truth or Consequences Hot Springs

References

Historic districts on the National Register of Historic Places in New Mexico
National Register of Historic Places in Sierra County, New Mexico
Traditional Native American dwellings
Moderne architecture in the United States
Buildings and structures completed in 1916
Native American history of New Mexico